Joseph Elsby Martin Sr., (February 1, 1916 – September 14, 1996) was an American boxing coach who trained two world heavyweight champions, Muhammad Ali and Jimmy Ellis, as well as several national Golden Gloves champions.

Early life 
Joe Martin was born January 16, 1916, in Louisville, Kentucky, the son of Joe and Minerva "Sancia" (Shaw) Martin. Both of his parents died before he reached his first birthday, so he was raised by his mother's sister, his Aunt Emma and his uncle Clarence Neal who moved to Pueblo, Colorado and later moved to Alhambra, Phoenix, Arizona. On March 4, 1941, he married Christine Fentress, and they had one child, Joe Jr., who himself became a national Golden Gloves champion.

Boxing coach and police officer 
He came to Louisville, Kentucky, in 1937 and joined the Louisville Police Department, serving until his retirement in 1974. In 1938, he became a boxing coach at the Columbia Gym in Louisville (now the student center of Spalding University), where, in 1954, he began coaching Cassius Clay, who later became a three-time world heavyweight champion under the name of Muhammad Ali. Several news stories quote Ali crediting Martin with having shown him how to "fly like a butterfly, sting like a bee."  While coaching at the Columbia Gym, Martin also trained world heavyweight champion Jimmy Ellis as well as eleven National Golden Gloves champions.

Martin, himself a white man, was an early leader in Louisville's civil rights movement. At the time the future Muhammad Ali began training there, Columbia Gym was racially integrated, unlike other Louisville boxing gyms of that period.

Muhammad Ali's first coach 
In 1954, a twelve-year-old then known as Cassius Clay approached Martin to report that his bicycle had been stolen and told Martin that he wanted to "whup" the thief. Martin offered to teach him how to box and guided his career for the next six years. As a 1960 Olympic coach, Martin accompanied the champion to the Olympic Games in Rome, Italy, when Ali won a gold medal. In the 1950s and 1960s, Martin helped produce a weekly television show on WAVE-TV called Tomorrow's Champions, which was broadcast for twelve years. After winning the gold medal, Ali began his professional career but maintained contact with Martin until his death.  In the 1970s, Martin appeared on a nationally televised episode of "This Is Your Life," when Ali was the featured guest

Retirement and death 
After retirement, Martin started a business as an auctioneer and twice ran unsuccessfully for Sheriff of Jefferson County, Kentucky.  He fell ill in the late summer of 1996 and died in Louisville on September 14.  He was buried in Memorial Gardens Cemetery in Leitchfield, Kentucky.

See also 

List of people from the Louisville metropolitan area

References

External links 
 

1916 births
1996 deaths
American boxing trainers
Louisville Metro Police Department officers
Sportspeople from Colorado
Sportspeople from Louisville, Kentucky